Trochetia parviflora is a very rare shrub from the genus Trochetia endemic to Mauritius. Traditionally included in the family Sterculiaceae, it is included in the expanded Malvaceae in the APG and most subsequent systematics.

Description
Trochetia parviflora is a much-branched low shrub which can reach a height up to four metres. The bark has a lepidote brown pubescence which is much thinner than in Trochetia uniflora and Trochetia triflora.  On the branches fruits are placed in a group of three.  The oblong and entire leaves have a length between 2.5 and 3.8 centimetres.  The leaf base is rather rounded.  The upperside of the leaf is obtused and scabrous, the underside is thinly scurfy.

Status
In the past Trochetia parviflora was known from the forest at Montagne-Ory. After botanist Philip Burnard Ayres collected the last known specimens in 1863 it was long regarded as lost until 76 individuals were rediscovered in April 2001 by the Mauritian botanists  Vincent Florens and Jean-Claude Sevathian, from the Mauritius Herbarium, on a rocky slope of the Corps de Garde six kilometres apart from the type locality. It was assumed that this species has reduced its original range due to competition with invasive alien plants and seed predation by invasive monkeys and rats. Today the biggest threats are wildfire and landslides.

References 

J.G. Baker: Flora of Mauritius and the Seychelles: A Description of the Flowering Plants. Asian Educational Services, 1999.

External links 
 Mauritius Post Ltd. First Day Cover. (engl.)
 Herbarium specimen Royal Botanic Garden Kew

parviflora
Endemic flora of Mauritius
Taxa named by John Gilbert Baker
Taxa named by Wenceslas Bojer